Paul Thomas Leo Marazzi (born 24 January 1975) is a British musician. He is the oldest member of boy band A1.

Marazzi was the first to join A1, a British/Norwegian boy band whose first single, "Be the First to Believe", was released in 1999. Together with Marazzi were Britons Mark Read, Ben Adams and Norwegian Christian Ingebrigtsen. They were formed by band manager Tim Byrne, who also formed Steps, and signed to Columbia Records by A&R manager Fran de Takats. A1 won a BRIT Award for "British Breakthrough Act" in 2001. Their third album, Make It Good, featured a sound closer to traditional rock music, but was to be their last studio project with Marazzi.

In October 2002, Marazzi took a break from the band citing personal reasons. Marazzi never gave a proper explanation on why he left the band letting fans wonder why he really left the band. In 2005, he started a band called Snagsby. He left Snagsby in January 2009 to pursue a career as a club DJ in The George Hotel in Whitby.

Early life
Marazzi was born on 24 January 1975 in Wanstead, London, to Ivan and Maria Marazzi. He is of Italian descent.

Marazzi went to Spain with his family and lived there until 2007. He recorded a demo for a German producer which led him to audition for A1 in 1997.

A1

Marazzi said that he originally auditioned for Steps, however, he was placed in a1 in 1997. He was then later joined by Christian Ingebrigtsen, Mark Read and Ben Adams. They released their first album Here We Come in late 1999. Two years after their first single release in the 2001 BRIT Awards, the band received the award for Best British Breakthrough. In 2002, few months after their appearance in the US soap The Young and The Restless, Paul then announced his departure from a1 with a statement that read: "After a lot of thought and deliberation, I have made the difficult choice to leave the band due to personal reasons." In an interview on YouTube, Marazzi stated he left the band as he knew their Make It Good album was not that great, and that he might as well jump off the sinking ship.

Post A1
After a1, Marazzi hosted the Andy Cole Children's Foundation (now All Star Kids) on 26 April 2003 together with Jo Good. He turned down the offer to appear in I'm a Celebrity... Get Me out of Here! in 2004. In mid-2005, Paul was interviewed in Spain for Fame Games where he talked about the life being in a1. The interview was aired on 31 July 2006 and also played (partly) two of his unreleased songs namely If I Could Be King and Lifted. Marazzi also revealed that he will be touring Germany with Spencer Davis Group.

In late 2011, Marazzi was rehearsing/recording with Nobby in his previous bands (Snagsby now known as Audio Tracer) studio in Sunderland and Paul has formed a new band called Blue Eyed Soul. His father announced the news to his fans on Facebook. Just recently, he just become a Patron for MACY (Music and Arts for Creative Youth).

In August 2009, A1 reunited as a trio in Norway for a TV show after Marazzi refused to rejoin the band. In 2013, he was invited to take part on The Big Reunion (series 2) with a1 but Marazzi refused again to rejoin the band as he wanted to meet up in private instead. Marazzi made a tweet attacking the band prior to the series. It was after a misunderstanding between him and the band.

He later released a song called Eleven Years (feat. Rockwool Sari) which states how he really feels about the band. The song was officially released on 25 March 2014 and is available on iTunes. Another song was planned to be released with an accompanying video and was already recorded, but Marazzi later shelved the idea as he prefers live singing.

On 30 November 2014, while a1 was performing in Newcastle for Big Reunion Boyband Tour, Paul tweeted to ask everyone to stop saying nasty things about his ex- bandmates. This would make people wonder if they have patched things up. With this tweet it is presumed that he just wanted a1 fans (old and new) to be quiet and to leave him alone.

Marazzi was working as a cabinet maker based in Northumberland, and singing part-time with a wedding band called Hip Operations. Marazzi joined after his stint with the band for It's A Disco Night in late 2012. He has recently worked with the Overtones, Damage, S Club, and 5ive.

In 2016 Marazzi announced the birth of his daughter Sofia with his partner Nathalie. They later went on to have another daughter Amelia in 2018. Marazzi did an interview on BBC Radio Tees just before he went on the Boys are Back tour as he now lives in Trimdon County Durham.

Reunion with A1
On 22 July 2017, Marazzi met with his former bandmates in Newcastle and discussed possibilities of a reunion. The meeting was kept secret until Ben Adams posted a photo of him and Marazzi taken in Sunderland in September that same year. The band later on revealed that a reunion with Marazzi is happening upon the announcement of their Southeast Asian Tour in October 2018.

Musical influences
Marazzi is a fan of Prince. On the official website of Snagsby as well as on his Facebook page, he stated that he is a fan of Shakin' Stevens, Lenny Kravitz, Red Hot Chili Peppers, George Michael and Michael Jackson.

Discography
With A1

Albums
 Here We Come (1999)
 The A List (2000)
 Make It Good (2002)
 The Best of A1 (2004)
 A1 Greatest Hits (2009)

Singles
 "Be the First to Believe" (1999)
 "Summertime of Our Lives" (1999)
 "Ready or Not/Everytime" (1999)
 "Like a Rose" (2000)
 "Take On Me" (2000)
 "Same Old Brand New You" (2000)
 "No More" (2001)
 "Caught in the Middle" (2002)
 "Make It Good" (2002)
 "Nos Differences" (2002)

Solo
 Eleven Years (featuring Rockwool Sari)

See also
A1

References

1975 births
English male singers
English pop singers
Living people
A1 (band) members
People from Wanstead
Singers from London
English people of Italian descent